Leonardo is a British action-adventure television series which aired on the CBBC for two series between 2011 and 2012. Set in 15th-century Florence, the show follows the adventures of a teenage Leonardo da Vinci played by Jonathan Bailey.

Premise

Series 1 
An exciting action-packed 13-episode series full of mystery, adventure and an unfolding love story, which steps back in time 500 years. Set against the breathtaking backdrop of Renaissance Florence, Leonardo is far from a typical period drama. It's fast-paced with modern music and language, and a fashion sense that is more high street than high culture. At the heart of the group is the young Leonardo da Vinci, or simply Leo, played by Jonathan Bailey. Working as an apprentice, he's not just a genius; he's an unstoppable, free-thinking creative force who's always ten steps ahead of the rest.

Series 2 
With the threat of Pietro de' Medici hanging over them, Leonardo (Jonathan Bailey) and his friends are determined to keep their heads down. But not for long. The second series of the hit show kicks off from start to finish as Florence plunges into an unjustified war. Secrets, murders and family loyalties fly everywhere as the story line unfolds to its epic climax.

Characters
 Leonardo da Vinci played by Jonathan Bailey
 Also known as Leo, he is an artist at Verrocchio's workshop. He loves painting, inventing, and creating new things.
 Tomaso/Lisa Gherardini played by Flora Spencer-Longhurst
 "Tom" is a girl who lives disguised as a male apprentice. She changed her name to Tomaso (her father's name) and ran away to join Verrocchio's workshop in Florence, in defiance of the 15th-century laws that banned women from becoming artists. She is the subject of the Mona Lisa and earlier versions.
 Niccolò Machiavelli played by Akemnji Ndifornyen
 Niccolò or "Mac" is the number one man when it come to fraud or theft and has a network of urchin spies and cut-purses throughout the city. He likes money-making schemes, chariot-racing and mingling with the rich and famous. Leo sometimes has to get him out of trouble.
 Lorenzo de' Medici played by Colin Ryan
 A wealthy boy, part of Florence's prestigious Medici family, he is largely bored by his life of luxury and enjoys sneaking away to join his friends. He is anxious to please his father whom he greatly admires.
 Piero de' Medici played by Alistair McGowan (series 1) and James Clyde (series 2)
 An ambitious man and cousin to the Duke of Florence, Piero keeps a close eye on all happenings in Florence, especially those that concern his son Lorenzo and his friends. He heads the mysterious secret society, the Luminari.
 Maestro Verrocchio played by James Cuningham
 Leo and Tom's maestro, Verrocchio is very strict and becomes impatient if his apprentices waste time. Leonardo is very loyal to his Maestro.
 Cosimo played by Thembalethu Ntuli
 A servant at Verrocchio's workshop
 Teresa de' Medici played by Camilla Waldman
 Lorenzo's doting mother
 Placidi played by Bart Fouche
 Head of Security at the Medici Palace and Piero's right-hand man in series 2
 Angelica Visconti played by Roxane Hayward
 The rich and beautiful daughter of the wealthy Visconti family and Lorenzo's fiancée in series 2
 Rocco de' Medici played by Clayton Boyd
 The hot-headed long-lost son of the Duke of Florence in series 2

Production
Leonardo began as a novel outline by Tom Mason and Dan Danko portraying Leonardo da Vinci as a "teenage Renaissance Batman". Although never actually used in a book, Mason and Danko were able to interest the BBC in their unpublished story idea. It was optioned by the BBC in late 2009 and the pre-production was completed by summer 2010. The first series of Leonardo was shot on location in South Africa throughout the second half of 2010. A second series was completed on location in Cape Town and was aired in 2012. Roxane Hayward, Bart Fouche, Katie McGlynn and Pam St. Clement guest-starred in the second series.

A second series premiered on the CBBC on 20 September 2012, starting with episodes one and two being shown back to back as an hour-long instalments called Illusion. For Series 2, actor James Clyde replaced Alistair McGowan in the role of Piero de' Medici.

Historical accuracy
A Friday Download promotion for Leonardo suggested that the series is factual, but the series is misleading in certain respects. For example, in series 1, episode 5 the eponymous hero falls in love with a girl called Valentina. Art historians, including Kenneth Clark, have argued that Leonardo da Vinci was homosexual, and had no romantic interest in women. Another problem is that the action is said to take place in Florence in 1467. However, in episode 8 Leonardo is shown in competition with Michelangelo, who was not even born until 1475. In an interview with C21 Media, co-director Melanie Stokes said that "we play fast and loose with history and it's not the job of a drama to give facts... but to inspire imagination." Episode 8 accurately references Leonardo's vegetarianism and love of nature (buying caged birds to release them).

The portrayal of Piero de' Medici as scheming to overthrow the Duke of Florence is misleading; in 1467, Medici was the de facto ruler of Florence, and the city state would only acquire a Duke in 1532, when the title was given to Piero's descendant Alessandro de' Medici.

The character of Niccolò Machiavelli is portrayed by Akemnji Ndifornyen, a black actor, whereas the real Niccolò Machiavelli was white. Furthermore, there appears to be no discernible age difference between his character and that of Leonardo, who was in reality 17 years his senior.

The characters all speak modern English, occasionally exclaiming "bella!" or "magnifico!" to remind the audience that they are supposed to be Italians. Contemporary pop songs are used for the music soundtrack.

Leonardo is frequently shown inventing things that are ahead of their time, most notably a wooden bicycle (actually invented 1817; Leo's design is close to a BMX, invented in the 1970s), which first appears in "Anything is Possible" and is later given a gunpowder engine (invented 1600s). The series one finale involves an indestructible suit of mechanical armour, and the series two ended with a "superweapon" – a mobile armoured tank with a cannon mounted in a rotating turret, an exaggeration of Leonardo da Vinci's fighting vehicle.

Leonardo's costume is also rather anachronistic, with his sneakers and chinos being more reminiscent of modern-day clothing than that of 15th-century Florence.

Episodes

Series 1 (2011)

Series 2 (2012)

Spin-off online game 
In 2012 an online game based on the second series was released. Entitled Leonardo, the game allows players to defeat the villain Il Drago who has stolen Leonardo's inventions. The game was nominated for a 2013 KidScreen Award for Best Companion Website.

Accolades 
In 2012, Leonardo won three KidScreen Awards for Best Non-Animated or Mixed Series, Best Music, and Best Design. It was also nominated for the Ivor Novello Award for Best Television Soundtrack, the Best Youth Program Award at the Banff World Media Festival, and the Award for Youth Fiction at the Rose d'Or. It was also nominated for a children's television award at the Prix Jeunesse International Festival in Munich.

See also
 Da Vinci's Demons, another fictional account of Leonardo da Vinci's early life
 Cultural depictions of Leonardo da Vinci
 Personal life of Leonardo da Vinci

References

External links
 

BBC children's television shows
2010s British children's television series
2011 British television series debuts
2012 British television series endings
Television shows set in Italy
Television shows filmed in South Africa
Adventure television series
Television series by Kindle Entertainment
English-language television shows
Cultural depictions of Niccolò Machiavelli
Depictions of Leonardo da Vinci on television
Cultural depictions of Lorenzo de' Medici
Television shows set in Florence
Television series by BBC Studios
British time travel television series
Works about Leonardo da Vinci